Basovo is a rural locality (a selo) in Valuysky District, Belgorod Oblast, Russia. The population was 168 in 2010. There are three streets.

Geography 
Basovo is located 19 km north of Valuyki (the district's administrative centre) by road. Timonovo is the nearest rural locality.

References 

Rural localities in Valuysky District